OUS may refer to:
    
Ohio University Southern Campus
Okayama University of Science
Open University of Sudan
Operation United Shield
Oregon University System
Organizational unit (computing)
Ourinhos Airport
Oxford Union Society

See also
Ous (name)